Huff or huffing may refer to:

People
 Huff (surname), a list of people with the surname

Places in the United States
 Huff Township, Spencer County, Indiana
 Huff, Missouri, an unincorporated community
 Huff, Kentucky, an unincorporated community
 Huff, North Dakota, an unincorporated community 
 Huff, Texas, a former town
 Huff Archeological Site, a Mandan village in North Dakota dated around 1450, on the National Register of Historic Places
 Huff Creek (disambiguation)
 Huff Run, a tributary of the Conotton Creek in eastern Ohio
 Huff's Fort, established around 1811 or 1812 in Jackson County, Indiana

Buildings
 Huff Hall, a multi-purpose arena in Champaign, Illinois
 Huff House, the oldest house in Atlanta, Georgia; demolished in 1954
 Huff Memorial Library, Jackson, Wyoming, on the National Register of Historic Places
 Huff's Store, a general store in Burwood, Tennessee, on the National Register of Historic Places

Arts and entertainment
 Huff (TV series), a Showtime television program
 Hamilton Underground Film Festival, a yearly experimental film festival in Hamilton, New Zealand

Other uses
 Huffing, a slang term for the use of inhalants
 Huffing or huff cough, a type of coughing used to clear airways of mucus
 Huffing, a forfeit in checkers

See also
 HUF (disambiguation)
 Huff-Duff (HF/DF) High Frequency Direction Finder
 Huff-Daland Aero Corp